James Bryan Wagner, known as Bryan Wagner (March 2, 1943 – July 29, 2018), was the first Republican since Reconstruction to have been elected to the New Orleans City Council. He filled a vacancy of an unexpired term in District A from May 1980 to April 1982 and a full term until 1986.

Background
Wagner's brother, Wiltz Wagner, Jr. (born July 7, 1939), of Fairhope, Alabama, is a Ph.D. professor and lung specialist at the University of South Alabama College of Medicine in Mobile.

Wagner attended Isidore Newman School, New Orleans Academy, and Tulane University. He operated an insurance agency on Carondelet Street in New Orleans.

In later years, Wagner became heavily involved in horse racing. He often spent summers in Del Mar, California, to be near the famed racetrack. Wagner won the 2009 National Handicapping Championship Tour, as it was then known, and qualified twelve times to the National Horseplayers Championship, during which he earned $101,000. He was part of the NHC since its founding in 1999. For two years, he could not qualify because his wife and the mother of their three children, the former Judy White (born June 9, 1950), sat on the board of directors of the National Thoroughbred Racing Association.

Political life
The electoral success of Wilson, Terrell, and Batt benefited from the Republican leanings of District A.

In 2008, Wagner served as manager for the successful campaign of Joseph Cao for Louisiana's 2nd congressional district. Cao was subsequently unseated in 2010 by the Democrat Cedric Richmond, who still holds the seat.

Wagner's memorial service was held on August 6, 2018 at the chapel at Christ Church, 2919 St. Charles Avenue.

References

1943 births
2018 deaths
New Orleans City Council members
Louisiana Republicans
Businesspeople from New Orleans
Insurance agents
American Anglicans
20th-century American businesspeople